The Bryansk single-member constituency (No. 77) is a Russian legislative constituency in the Bryansk Oblast.

Members elected
By-elections are shown in italics.

Election results

1993 

|-
! colspan=2 style="background-color:#E9E9E9;text-align:left;vertical-align:top;" |Candidate
! style="background-color:#E9E9E9;text-align:left;vertical-align:top;" |Party
! style="background-color:#E9E9E9;text-align:right;" |Votes
! style="background-color:#E9E9E9;text-align:right;" |%
|-
|style="background-color: " |
|align=left|Anatoly Vorontsov
|align=left|Agrarian Party
|94,052
|26.79%
|-
|style="background-color:#0085BE"|
|align=left|Stanislav Belyshev
|align=left|Choice of Russia
| -
|18.80%
|-
| colspan="5" style="background-color:#E9E9E9;"|
|- style="font-weight:bold"
| colspan="3" style="text-align:left;" | Total
| 351,077
| 100%
|-
| colspan="5" style="background-color:#E9E9E9;"|
|- style="font-weight:bold"
| colspan="4" |Source:
|
|}

1995 

|-
! colspan=2 style="background-color:#E9E9E9;text-align:left;vertical-align:top;" |Candidate
! style="background-color:#E9E9E9;text-align:left;vertical-align:top;" |Party
! style="background-color:#E9E9E9;text-align:right;" |Votes
! style="background-color:#E9E9E9;text-align:right;" |%
|-
|style="background-color: " |
|align=left|Vasily Shandybin
|align=left|Communist Party
|127,741
|32.86%
|-
|style="background-color: " |
|align=left|Valery Khramchenkov
|align=left|Liberal Democratic Party
|40,937
|10.53%
|-
|style="background-color:#1C1A0D" |
|align=left|Sergey Simutin
|align=left|Forward, Russia!
|30,369
|7.81%
|-
|style="background-color:#E98282" |
|align=left|Valentina Brezanskaya
|align=left|Women of Russia
|20,817
|5.36%
|-
|style="background-color:"|
|align=left|Viktor Sinenko
|align=left|Our Home – Russia
|17,261
|4.44%
|-
|style="background-color:"|
|align=left|Boris Kopyrnov
|align=left|Agrarian Party
|16,343
|4.20%
|-
|style="background-color:#3C3E42"|
|align=left|Anatoly Tokarev
|align=left|Duma-96
|12,712
|3.27%
|-
|style="background-color: " |
|align=left|Vladimir Leonov
|align=left|Independent
|11,880
|3.06%
|-
|style="background-color: " |
|align=left|Valery Polyakov
|align=left|Independent
|10,964
|2.82%
|-
|style="background-color: " |
|align=left|Vladimir Fetisov
|align=left|Independent
|10,812
|2.78%
|-
|style="background-color:" |
|align=left|Gennady Shilin
|align=left|Congress of Russian Communities
|10,163
|2.61%
|-
|style="background-color: " |
|align=left|Valery Korneyenkov
|align=left|Independent
|7,325
|1.88%
|-
|style="background-color:#959698" |
|align=left|Valery Derzhavin
|align=left|Derzhava
|6,710
|1.73%
|-
|style="background-color: " |
|align=left|Sergey Kozlov
|align=left|Independent
|6,640
|1.71%
|-
|style="background-color:#00A200" |
|align=left|Anatoly Amelin
|align=left|Transformation of the Fatherland
|4,946
|1.27%
|-
|style="background-color: " |
|align=left|Aleksandr Senin
|align=left|Independent
|4,878
|1.25%
|-
|style="background-color: |
|align=left|Igor Balyasnikov
|align=left|League of Independent Scientists
|3,885
|1.00%
|-
|style="background-color: |
|align=left|Aleksandr Barsukov
|align=left|Revival
|3,552
|0.91%
|-
|style="background-color: " |
|align=left|Anatoly Vaskov
|align=left|Independent
|1,172
|0.30%
|-
|style="background-color:#000000"|
|colspan=2 |against all
|33,770
|8.69%
|-
| colspan="5" style="background-color:#E9E9E9;"|
|- style="font-weight:bold"
| colspan="3" style="text-align:left;" | Total
| 388,707
| 100%
|-
| colspan="5" style="background-color:#E9E9E9;"|
|- style="font-weight:bold"
| colspan="4" |Source:
|
|}

1999 

|-
! colspan=2 style="background-color:#E9E9E9;text-align:left;vertical-align:top;" |Candidate
! style="background-color:#E9E9E9;text-align:left;vertical-align:top;" |Party
! style="background-color:#E9E9E9;text-align:right;" |Votes
! style="background-color:#E9E9E9;text-align:right;" |%
|-
|style="background-color: "|
|align=left|Vasily Shandybin (incumbent)
|align=left|Communist Party
|132,346
|36.59%
|-
|style="background-color: "|
|align=left|Nikolay Denin
|align=left|Independent
|64,150
|17.73%
|-
|style="background-color:#1042A5"|
|align=left|Lyudmila Komogortseva
|align=left|Union of Right Forces
|26,913
|7.44%
|-
|style="background-color: "|
|align=left|Lyudmila Narusova
|align=left|Independent
|21,349
|5.90%
|-
|style="background-color: " |
|align=left|Sergey Kurdenko
|align=left|Liberal Democratic Party
|12,308
|3.40%
|-
|style="background-color: "|
|align=left|Anatoly Bugaev
|align=left|Independent
|10,134
|2.80%
|-
|style="background-color:"|
|align=left|Anatoly Chernyavsky
|align=left|Our Home – Russia
|10,077
|2.79%
|-
|style="background-color:"|
|align=left|Andrey Ponomarev
|align=left|Yabloko
|9,858
|2.73%
|-
|style="background-color: "|
|align=left|Olga Denisova
|align=left|Independent
|8,466
|2.34%
|-
|style="background-color:#3B9EDF"|
|align=left|Aleksandr Salov
|align=left|Fatherland – All Russia
|8,185
|2.26%
|-
|style="background-color: "|
|align=left|Gennady Gorelov
|align=left|Independent
|4,749
|1.31%
|-
|style="background-color: "|
|align=left|Aleksandr Kolomeytsev
|align=left|Independent
|3,370
|0.93%
|-
|style="background-color:#084284"|
|align=left|Marina Paramoshkina
|align=left|Spiritual Heritage
|3,076
|0.85%
|-
|style="background-color: "|
|align=left|Nikolay Ignatkov
|align=left|Independent
|2,825
|0.78%
|-
|style="background-color:#020266"|
|align=left|Anatoly Karamyshev
|align=left|Russian Socialist Party
|1,628
|0.45%
|-
|style="background-color: "|
|align=left|Nikolay Zuykov
|align=left|Independent
|1,160
|0.32%
|-
|style="background-color:#000000"|
|colspan=2 |against all
|34,926
|9.66%
|-
| colspan="5" style="background-color:#E9E9E9;"|
|- style="font-weight:bold"
| colspan="3" style="text-align:left;" | Total
| 361,730
| 100%
|-
| colspan="5" style="background-color:#E9E9E9;"|
|- style="font-weight:bold"
| colspan="4" |Source:
|
|}

2003 

|-
! colspan=2 style="background-color:#E9E9E9;text-align:left;vertical-align:top;" |Candidate
! style="background-color:#E9E9E9;text-align:left;vertical-align:top;" |Party
! style="background-color:#E9E9E9;text-align:right;" |Votes
! style="background-color:#E9E9E9;text-align:right;" |%
|-
|style="background-color: " |
|align=left|Nikolay Denin
|align=left|United Russia
|99,845
|31.95%
|-
|style="background-color: "|
|align=left|Vasily Shandybin (incumbent)
|align=left|Communist Party
|79.415
|25.41%
|-
|style="background-color:#00A1FF"|
|align=left|Georgy Abushenko
|align=left|Party of Russia's Rebirth-Russian Party of Life
|29,628
|9.48%
|-
|style="background-color:#DD137B"|
|align=left|Nikolay Rudenok
|align=left|Social Democratic Party
|21,067
|6.74%
|-
|style="background-color: "|
|align=left|Lyudmila Komogortseva
|align=left|Independent
|17,912
|5.73%
|-
|style="background-color:#1042A5"|
|align=left|Ivan Fedotkin
|align=left|Union of Right Forces
|12,377
|3.96%
|-
|style="background-color: " |
|align=left|Sergey Maslov
|align=left|Liberal Democratic Party
|7,464
|2.39%
|-
|style="background-color:"|
|align=left|Andrey Ponomarev
|align=left|Yabloko
|3,466
|1.11%
|-
|style="background-color:"|
|align=left|Aleksandr Ishchenko
|align=left|National Patriotic Forces of Russian Federation
|3,223
|1.03%
|-
|style="background-color: "|
|align=left|Yury Grishin
|align=left|Independent
|2,984
|0.95%
|-
|style="background-color: "|
|align=left|Maria Belousova
|align=left|Independent
|2,869
|0.92%
|-
|style="background-color:#164C8C"|
|align=left|Tatyana Martynova
|align=left|United Russian Party Rus'
|2,305
|0.74%
|-
|style="background-color: "|
|align=left|Aleksandr Kolomoets
|align=left|Independent
|1,631
|0.52%
|-
|style="background-color:#7C73CC"|
|align=left|Zuleykhat Ul'basheva
|align=left|Great Russia–Eurasian Union
|482
|0.15%
|-
|style="background-color:#000000"|
|colspan=2 |against all
|23,879
|7.64%
|-
| colspan="5" style="background-color:#E9E9E9;"|
|- style="font-weight:bold"
| colspan="3" style="text-align:left;" | Total
| 312,511
| 100%
|-
| colspan="5" style="background-color:#E9E9E9;"|
|- style="font-weight:bold"
| colspan="4" |Source:
|
|}

2005 
The results of the by-election were invalidated due to low turnout and another by-election was scheduled for 12 March 2006 

|-
! colspan=2 style="background-color:#E9E9E9;text-align:left;vertical-align:top;" |Candidate
! style="background-color:#E9E9E9;text-align:left;vertical-align:top;" |Party
! style="background-color:#E9E9E9;text-align:right;" |Votes
! style="background-color:#E9E9E9;text-align:right;" |%
|-
|style="background-color: " |
|align=left|Viktor Malashenko
|align=left|United Russia
|63,900
|44.89%
|-
|style="background-color: "|
|align=left|Andrey Ivanov
|align=left|Independent
|47,736
|33.53%
|-
|style="background-color: "|
|align=left|Vladimir Babakov
|align=left|Independent
|4,375
|3.07%
|-
|style="background-color: "|
|align=left|Mikhail Veselkin
|align=left|Independent
|2,691
|1.89%
|-
|style="background-color:#000000"|
|colspan=2 |against all
|20,003
|14.05%
|-
| colspan="5" style="background-color:#E9E9E9;"|
|- style="font-weight:bold"
| colspan="3" style="text-align:left;" | Total
| 142,336
| 100%
|-
| colspan="5" style="background-color:#E9E9E9;"|
|- style="font-weight:bold"
| colspan="4" |Source:
|
|}

2006 

|-
! colspan=2 style="background-color:#E9E9E9;text-align:left;vertical-align:top;" |Candidate
! style="background-color:#E9E9E9;text-align:left;vertical-align:top;" |Party
! style="background-color:#E9E9E9;text-align:right;" |Votes
! style="background-color:#E9E9E9;text-align:right;" |%
|-
|style="background-color: " |
|align=left|Viktor Malashenko
|align=left|United Russia
|108,773
|62.40%
|-
|style="background-color: " |
|align=left|Valery Khramchenkov
|align=left|Liberal Democratic Party
|27,553
|15.80%
|-
|style="background-color:#000000"|
|colspan=2 |against all
|31,803
|18.24%
|-
| colspan="5" style="background-color:#E9E9E9;"|
|- style="font-weight:bold"
| colspan="3" style="text-align:left;" | Total
| 174,289
| 100%
|-
| colspan="5" style="background-color:#E9E9E9;"|
|- style="font-weight:bold"
| colspan="4" |Source:
|
|}

2016 

|-
! colspan=2 style="background-color:#E9E9E9;text-align:left;vertical-align:top;" |Candidate
! style="background-color:#E9E9E9;text-align:left;vertical-align:top;" |Party
! style="background-color:#E9E9E9;text-align:right;" |Votes
! style="background-color:#E9E9E9;text-align:right;" |%
|-
|style="background-color: " |
|align=left|Vladimir Zhutenkov
|align=left|United Russia
|166,146
|58.6%
|-
|style="background-color: " |
|align=left|Alexander Bogomaz
|align=left|Yabloko
|29,684
|10.5%
|-
|style="background-color: " |
|align=left|Konstantin Pavlov
|align=left|Communist Party
|27,840
|9.8%
|-
|style="background-color: " |
|align=left|Dmitry Vinokurov
|align=left|Liberal Democratic Party
|25,644
|9.0%
|-
|style="background-color: " |
|align=left|Valery Khramchenkov
|align=left|A Just Russia
|9,640
|3.4%
|-
|style="background: #E62020;"| 
|align=left|Yelena Shanina
|align=left|Communists of Russia
|9,090
|3.2%
|-
|style="background-color: " |
|align=left|Aleksey Alkhimov
|align=left|Patriots of Russia
|3,973
|1.4%
|-
|style="background-color: " |
|align=left|Roman Lobzin
|align=left|Rodina
|3,563
|1.3%
|-
|style="background: #0047AB;"| 
|align=left|Mikhail Lelebin
|align=left|Party of Growth
|3,191
|1.1%
|-
|style="background-color: " |
|align=left|Dmitry Kornilov
|align=left|Civic Platform
|2,450
|0.9%
|-
| colspan="5" style="background-color:#E9E9E9;"|
|- style="font-weight:bold"
| colspan="3" style="text-align:left;" | Total
| 281,221
| 100%
|-
| colspan="5" style="background-color:#E9E9E9;"|
|- style="font-weight:bold"
| colspan="4" |Source:
|
|}

2017 

|-
! colspan=2 style="background-color:#E9E9E9;text-align:left;vertical-align:top;" |Candidate
! style="background-color:#E9E9E9;text-align:left;vertical-align:top;" |Party
! style="background-color:#E9E9E9;text-align:right;" |Votes
! style="background-color:#E9E9E9;text-align:right;" |%
|-
|style="background-color: " |
|align=left|Boris Paykin
|align=left|Liberal Democratic Party
|93,794
|52.0%
|-
|style="background-color: #0047AB" |
|align=left|Sergey Gorelov
|align=left|Party of Growth
|17,120
|9.5%
|-
|style="background-color: " |
|align=left|Alexander Kupriyanov
|align=left|Communist Party
|16,911
|9.3%
|-
|style="background-color: " |
|align=left|Sergey Kurdenko
|align=left|A Just Russia
|11,123
|6.2%
|-
|style="background: #C21022;"| 
|align=left|Vladimir Vorozhtsov
|align=left|Party of Pensioners
|8,814
|4.9%
|-
|style="background-color: " |
|align=left|Konstantin Kasaminsky
|align=left|Patriots of Russia
|6,928
|3.8%
|-
|style="background-color: " |
|align=left|Olga Matokhina
|align=left|Yabloko
|6,746
|3.7%
|-
|style="background: #E62020;"| 
|align=left|Sergey Malinkovich
|align=left|Communists of Russia
|6,159
|3.4%
|-
|style="background-color: " |
|align=left|Nikolay Alekseyenko
|align=left|Rodina
|4,890
|2.7%
|-
| colspan="5" style="background-color:#E9E9E9;"|
|- style="font-weight:bold"
| colspan="3" style="text-align:left;" | Total
| 172,485
| 100%
|-
| colspan="5" style="background-color:#E9E9E9;"|
|- style="font-weight:bold"
| colspan="4" |Source:
|
|}

2021

|-
! colspan=2 style="background-color:#E9E9E9;text-align:left;vertical-align:top;" |Candidate
! style="background-color:#E9E9E9;text-align:left;vertical-align:top;" |Party
! style="background-color:#E9E9E9;text-align:right;" |Votes
! style="background-color:#E9E9E9;text-align:right;" |%
|-
|style="background-color: " |
|align=left|Nikolay Valuev
|align=left|United Russia
|206,442
|62.56%
|-
|style="background-color: " |
|align=left|Konstantin Pavlov
|align=left|Communist Party
|49,574
|15.02%
|-
|style="background-color: " |
|align=left|Aleksey Timoshkov
|align=left|A Just Russia — For Truth
|17,313
|5.25%
|-
|style="background-color: " |
|align=left|Denis Semenov
|align=left|Liberal Democratic Party
|14,759
|4.47%
|-
|style="background-color: "|
|align=left|Denis Nosenko
|align=left|New People
|10,838
|3.28%
|-
|style="background-color: " |
|align=left|Andrey Zimonin
|align=left|Party of Pensioners
|10,217
|3.10%
|-
|style="background-color: " |
|align=left|Sergey Gorelov
|align=left|Party of Growth
|5,291
|1.60%
|-
|style="background-color: " |
|align=left|Dmitry Kornilov
|align=left|Civic Platform
|4,642
|1.41%
|-
|style="background-color: "|
|align=left|Roman Lobzin
|align=left|Rodina
|3,655
|1.11%
|-
| colspan="5" style="background-color:#E9E9E9;"|
|- style="font-weight:bold"
| colspan="3" style="text-align:left;" | Total
| 329,981
| 100%
|-
| colspan="5" style="background-color:#E9E9E9;"|
|- style="font-weight:bold"
| colspan="4" |Source:
|
|}

Notes

Sources
77. Брянский одномандатный избирательный округ

References

Russian legislative constituencies
Politics of Bryansk Oblast